Ben Nevis railway station is an abandoned station on the Avoca railway line, a railway line running from Ararat to Avoca and onto Maryborough in the Australian state of Victoria. It also acted as the terminus of the abandoned Navarre railway line  to Navarre, a community in the Wimmera region of Victoria, which was closed in 1954.

Little remained of the station in 2013 situated near the intersection of the Pyrenees Highway and the Buangor – Ben Nevis Road, although earthworks associated with it are clearly visible nearby as can the rail lines themselves.

Proposal
In 2017, there is a proposal entitled the, Murray Basin rail project designed to link Mildura to Portland with standard gauge track to carry grain and mineral sands.  This upgrading will include the Maryborough to Ararat section of the line, past the site of the disused Ben Nevis station.

The Avoca line reopened in 2018 after a complete rebuild as part of the Murray Basin Rail Project, which also extended the reach of the standard gauge network in Victoria.

See also
 Ararat railway station
 Avoca railway line
 Avoca railway station, Victoria
 Homebush railway station, Victoria
 Navarre railway line

References

External links 
  Avoca and District Historical Society
 Avoca station at VicRailStations.com
 Postcodes Ben Nevis
 Railway Map of Victoria

Disused railway stations in Victoria (Australia)